Bantam Residency, sometimes spelled Banten Residency, was an administrative division (Residency) of the Dutch East Indies which existed from 1817 to 1942; it was located at the western point of Java and its capital was at Serang. Its borders largely correspond to the present-day Indonesian province of Banten.

History

Prehistory
Prior to the imposition of Dutch rule on the region, Banten was home to the Banten Sultanate; that kingdom turned away Portuguese efforts to establish a foothold there in the sixteenth century, and later clashed with the Mataram Sultanate. The British East India Company had a presence there during the seventeenth century, the Bantam Presidency. As the Dutch East India Company expanded their areas of control across Java, Banten signed a treaty in 1659 establishing a border between them and the Dutch-controlled areas, and the British were forced to withdraw. After that, trade from Banten in the Sunda Strait continued to be so successful that the Dutch founded Batavia partly to try and attract trade away from it and towards them. Over time, as Dutch power increased, they demanded territorial concessions from Banten as well, culminating in recognition of Dutch Suzerainty in 1774. It was the period of the French and British interregnum in the Dutch East Indies that ended the rule of Banten; the northern coast was conquered in 1808, and the rest of the former sultanate came under direct European rule when Stamford Raffles invaded it 1813.

Residency
After the Dutch regained control of Java in 1816, they started to create a new Residency system; by 1819 the new Bantam Residency was divided into northern and southern Regencies which in turn were divided into districts and sub-districts.

The Residency was faced with a number of catastrophes in the late nineteenth century. In 1881–2 there was a cattle plague which led to widespread famine, followed by a fever epidemic which killed ten per cent of the population. The 1883 eruption of Krakatoa took a heavy toll on Bantam Residency, as the island the volcano is located on is not far from it; a number of coastal areas were destroyed, more than twenty thousand of its residents died, and the coastline was permanently altered. Aside from that catastrophe, in general Bantam was the least populated part of Java during the late nineteenth century; it had the lowest population density of any residency in Java in 1890. The Residency was connected by railway with Batavia and other parts of Java in 1900 and 1906, which increased agricultural exploitation.

Bantam Residency managed to avoid the restructuring and subdivision of a number of other residencies in Java, keeping essentially the same borders from the nineteenth century to the end of Dutch rule. It ceased to be a Dutch residency with the Japanese occupation of the Dutch East Indies in 1942; after the war, when Indonesia gained its independence, it became the new province of Banten with essentially the same borders as the former Residency.

List of residents
 Jacobus de Bruin: 1817–1818
 Cornelis Vos: 1818–1819
 James du Puij: 1819–1819
 Joan Hendrik Tobias: 1819–1821
 Pieter van de Poel: 1821–1822
 Annius Abrahami de Melverda: 1822–1827
 Franciscus Henricus Smulders: 1827–1835
 Johan Frans Hora Siccama: 1835–1837
 Martinus Hendrikus Halewijn: 1837–1838
 Johan Frans Hora Siccama: 1838–1839
 Carel Frederik Goldman: 1839–1844
 Dirk Adolph Buijn: 1844–1851
 Gerrit Anthonij Everhardus Wiggers: 1851–1855
 Carel Pieter Brest van Kempen: 1855–1857
 Johan Carel van Lannoij: 1857–1861
 Oscar van Polanen Petel: 1861–1865
 Johan Hendrik van der Palm: 1865–1872
 Bastiaan van Baak: 1872–1874
 Felix Ernest Parmenas van den Bossche: 1874–1877
 Willem Frederik van Andel: 1877–1878
 Johannes Petrus Metman: 1878–1881
 Adrianus Johannes Spaan: 1881–1884
 Eduard Alexander Engelbrecht: 1884–1888
 Jacobus Albertus Velders: 1888–1892
 Bernard Hendrik Huibert Ravenswaay: 1892–1892
 Jacobus Albertus Velders: 1892–1895
 Johannes Anthonie Hardeman: 1895–1906
 Frederik Karel Overduijn: 1906–1911
 Cornelis Willem August van Rinsum: 1911–1913
 Herman Lodewijk Cornelis Bernard van Vleuten: 1913–1916
 Berend Leonardus van Bijlevelt: 1916–1918
 Willem Christiaan Thieme: 1918–1920
 Cornelis Canne: 1920–1921
 Theodorus Arnoldusster: 1921–1922
 Jan Christiaan Bedding: 1922–1925
 Frederik Gerhard Putman Cramer: 1925–1931
 Jan Scipio de Kanter: 1931–1934
 Armand Maurice van der Elst: 1934–1937
 Jan Robert van Beusekom: 1937–1941
 Willem Hendrik Coert: 1941–1942

References

Banten
Residencies of the Dutch East Indies
West Java